A men's 20-over cricket tournament at the 2015 Pacific Games in Port Moresby, Papua New Guinea, was held from 14 to 18 July 2015. Played at Amini Park and the Colts Cricket Ground, it was preceded by the women's tournament at the same venues the previous week.

Vanuatu were undefeated throughout the tournament, defeating Papua New Guinea in the final to win the gold medal for the first time (and become the first country other than PNG to win a gold medal in men's Pacific Games cricket). Tonga defeated New Caledonia in the bronze-medal play-off. Only four teams participated in the tournament, the same as at the 2011 tournament and two less than in the women's tournament. Because the 2015 World Twenty20 Qualifier was held at the same time, Papua New Guinea fielded a development squad at the Pacific Games, coached by John Ovia. Fiji and Samoa did not send men's teams, despite both their women's teams competing in the games. Cricket Fiji cited logistical reasons for not sending a team, stating their need to focus on their participation at the 2015 WCL Division Six tournament.

Group stage

Finals

Preliminary final (2nd vs 3rd)

Bronze-medal playoff

Final

Statistics

Most runs
The top five runscorers are included in this table, ranked by runs scored and then by batting average.

Source: CricHQ

Most wickets

The top five wicket takers are listed in this table, ranked by wickets taken and then by bowling average.

Source: CricHQ

See also
 Cricket at the 2015 Pacific Games – Women's tournament

References

External links
 Men's Cricket at XV Pacific Games
 Pacific Games Cricket 2015 at Cricket Archive

Pacific Games, men
Cricket in Papua New Guinea
Cricket at the 2015 Pacific Games